Vatican heraldry refers to the heraldry in the Vatican City State. These include the coats of arms of the Holy See and Vatican City and the Papal coats of arms. The heraldry of the Vatican also rules the arms and heraldic insignia of Roman Catholic priests, dioceses and abbeys around the world.

References

See also
Roman Catholic Heraldry

 
Heraldry